The Anglo-Frisian languages are the Anglic (English, Scots, and Yola) and Frisian (North Frisian, East Frisian, and West Frisian) varieties of the West Germanic languages.

 English cheese, Scots  and West Frisian , but Dutch , Low German , and German 
 English sheep, Scots  and West Frisian , but Dutch  (pl. ), Low German , German  (pl. )

The grouping is usually implied as a separate branch in regards to the tree model. According to this reading, English and Frisian would have had a proximal ancestral form in common that no other attested group shares. The early Anglo-Frisian varieties, like Old English and Old Frisian, and the third Ingvaeonic group at the time, the ancestor of Low German Old Saxon, were spoken by intercommunicating populations. While this has been cited as a reason for a few traits exclusively shared by Old Saxon and either Old English or Old Frisian, a genetic unity of the Anglo-Frisian languages beyond that of an Ingvaeonic subfamily cannot be considered a majority opinion. In fact, the groupings of Ingvaeonic and West Germanic languages are highly debated, even though they rely on much more innovations and evidence. Some scholars consider a Proto-Anglo-Frisian language as disproven, as far as such postulates are falsifiable. Nevertheless, the close ties and strong similarities between the Anglic and the Frisian grouping are part of the scientific consensus. Therefore, the concept of Anglo-Frisian languages can be useful and is today employed without these implications.

Geography isolated the settlers of Great Britain from Continental Europe, except from contact with communities capable of open water navigation. This resulted in more Old Norse and Norman language influences during the development of Modern English, whereas the modern Frisian languages developed under contact with the southern Germanic populations, restricted to the continent.

Classification

The proposed Anglo-Frisian family tree is:
Anglo-Frisian
 Anglic
English
Northumbrian and Cumbrian (see the article about the Humber-Lune Line)
Scots
Insular Scots
Northern Scots
Central Scots
Southern Scots
Doric Scots
Ulster Scots
Yola
Fingalian (extinct)
Frisian
West Frisian
East Frisian
Saterland Frisian (last remaining dialect of East Frisian)
North Frisian

Anglic languages

Anglic, Insular Germanic, or English languages encompass Old English and all the linguistic varieties descended from it. These include Middle English, Early Modern English, and Modern English; Early Scots, Middle Scots, and Modern Scots; Yola; and the extinct Fingallian in Ireland.

English-based creole languages are not generally included, as mainly only their lexicon and not necessarily their grammar, phonology, etc. comes from Modern and Early Modern English.

Frisian languages

The Frisian languages are a group of languages spoken by about 500,000 Frisian people on the southern fringes of the North Sea in the Netherlands and Germany. West Frisian, by far the most spoken of the three main branches, constitutes an official language in the Dutch province of Friesland. North Frisian is spoken on some North Frisian Islands and parts of mainland North Frisia in the northernmost German district of Nordfriesland, and also in Heligoland in the German Bight, both part of Schleswig-Holstein state (Heligoland is part of its mainland district of Pinneberg). The East Frisian language is spoken in Saterland in Germany.

Anglo-Frisian developments
The following is a summary of the major sound changes affecting vowels in chronological order. For additional detail, see Phonological history of Old English. That these were simultaneous and in that order for all Anglo-Frisian languages is considered disproved by some scholars.
 Backing and nasalization of West Germanic a and ā before a nasal consonant
 Loss of n before a spirant, resulting in lengthening and nasalization of preceding vowel
 Single form for present and preterite plurals
 A-fronting: West Germanic a, ā > æ, ǣ, even in the diphthongs ai and au (see Anglo-Frisian brightening)
  palatalization of Proto-Germanic  and  before front vowels (but not phonemicization of palatals)
 A-restoration: æ, ǣ > a, ā under the influence of neighboring consonants
 Second fronting: OE dialects (except West Saxon) and Frisian ǣ > ē
 A-restoration: a restored before a back vowel in the following syllable (later in the Southumbrian dialects); Frisian æu > au > Old Frisian ā/a
 OE breaking; in West Saxon palatal diphthongization follows
 i-mutation followed by syncope; Old Frisian breaking follows
 Phonemicization of palatals and assibilation, followed by second fronting in parts of West Mercia
 Smoothing and back mutation

Comparisons

Numbers in Anglo-Frisian languages
These are the words for the numbers one to 12 in the Anglo-Frisian languages, with Dutch and German included for comparison:

* Ae ,  is an adjectival form used before nouns.

Words in English, Scots, Yola, West Frisian, Dutch, and German

Alternative grouping

Ingvaeonic, also known as North Sea Germanic, is a postulated grouping of the West Germanic languages that encompasses Old Frisian, Old English, and Old Saxon.

It is not thought of as a monolithic proto-language, but rather as a group of closely related dialects that underwent several areal changes in relative unison.

The grouping was first proposed in Nordgermanen und Alemannen (1942) by the German linguist and philologist Friedrich Maurer (1898–1984),  as an alternative to the strict tree diagrams that had become popular following the work of the 19th-century linguist August Schleicher and which assumed the existence of an Anglo-Frisian group.

See also
 High German languages 
 Low Franconian languages

Notes

References

Further reading
    
 
 

 
West Germanic languages
North Sea Germanic